Renia is a genus of litter moths of the family Erebidae erected by Achille Guenée in 1854.

Species
 Renia adspergillus Bosc, 1800 – speckled renia moth
 Renia discoloralis Guenée, 1854 – discolored renia moth
 Renia factiosalis Walker, 1859 – sociable renia moth
 Renia flavipunctalis Geyer, 1832 – yellow-spotted renia moth
 Renia fraternalis J.B. Smith, 1895 – fraternal renia moth
 Renia hutsoni J.B. Smith, 1906
 Renia mortualis Barnes & McDunnough, 1912
 Renia nemoralis Barnes & McDunnough, 1918 – chocolate renia moth
 Renia pulverosalis J.B. Smith, 1895
 Renia rigida J.B. Smith, 1905
 Renia salusalis Walker, 1859
 Renia sobrialis Walker, 1859 – sober renia moth
 Renia subterminalis Barnes & McDunnough, 1912

Unpublished species
Renia n. sp. nr. discoloralis – Forbes' renia moth

References

Herminiinae
Moth genera